Dedelstorf is a municipality in the district of Gifhorn, in Lower Saxony, Germany. The Municipality Dedelstorf includes the villages of Allersehl, Dedelstorf, Langwedel, Lingwedel, Oerrel, Repke and Weddersehl.

References

Gifhorn (district)